This page lists notable outbreaks of anthrax, a disease of humans and other mammals caused by Bacillus anthracis, organized by year.


Incidents

References

Anthrax
anthrax